Kimba is a district in the Pool Department of Republic of the Congo.

References 

Pool Department
Districts of the Republic of the Congo